Roxana Condurache (born August 28, 1987 in Iași) is a Romanian actress. She garnered a Genie Award nomination for Best Supporting Actress at the 32nd Genie Awards, for her performance in the Canadian film The Whistleblower.

References

External links

Romanian film actresses
Actors from Iași
Living people
21st-century Romanian actresses
1987 births